Heartworm is an album by the Irish rock band Whipping Boy, released on 1 November 1995 on Columbia Records. It was recorded between September and November 1994 in Windmill Lane Studios, Dublin.

Heartworm was voted the seventh best Irish album of all time in a 2005 poll by the Irish magazine Hot Press. On 17 March 2013, it topped Phantom FM's poll of the top 50 Irish albums of all time.

Release
The album was reissued on 3 September 2021 by Pete Paphides' Needle Mythology label on double LP and double CD, both formats containing an extra 10 B-sides and demos. Pre-orders announced in July included an art print signed by Page, McDonnell and Hassett. The double LP sold out almost immediately during the pre-order, prompting a second pressing. The first pressing made Heartworm chart for the first time in the Official Irish Albums Chart Top 50 (at number 8 on week ending 16 September 2021), with the album re-entering at number 4 in January 2022.

Track listing
"Twinkle"
"When We Were Young"
"Tripped"
"The Honeymoon Is Over"
"We Don't Need Nobody Else"
"Blinded"
"Personality"
"Users"
"Fiction"
"Morning Rise"
"A Natural" (hidden track)

Personnel 
 Myles McDonnell – bass, backing vocals
 Fearghal McKee – vocals
 Colm Hassett – drums
 Paul Page – guitar
 The Dublin Symphony Orchestra

Charts

References

External links
 Heartworm at Amazon.com
Discography page on official website
Whipping Boy Heartworm Album Review by Continuum Transfunctioner

1995 albums
Whipping Boy (Irish band) albums